Takapuna Grammar School is a state coeducational secondary school located in the suburb of Belmont on the North Shore of Auckland, New Zealand. Established in 1927, the school mainly serves the eponymous suburb of Takapuna and the entire Devonport Peninsula.

History 
The foundation stone of Takapuna Grammar was laid on 6 April 1926 with the school opening officially in 1927. Takapuna Grammar School was the first co-educational school under the auspices of the Auckland Grammar Schools' Board, and established its own Board of Governors in 1955. The school retained the Auckland Grammar Lion and the motto "Per Angusta Ad Augusta" ("Through endeavour to greatness").

In 2012, the school controversially attempted to ban sandals in an attempt to improve public perception of the school. The decision was abandoned, however, after a group of students led by Abraham Coombs protested against the decision. The school subsequently surveyed students, parents, and teachers. The results of the poll (89% in opposition to the contentious decision) led to reinstatement of sandals in 2013.

In mid-2015 the school introduced a fortnightly vertical form class of around 15 students, where students were expected to engage with each other across year levels and help each other with their study. The move was controversial among students, however, as they saw it as leading to full-time vertical form classes and eventual abolition of horizontal forms. Sure enough, starting in 2017, the roles were reversed with vertical form classes doubling in size and becoming almost every morning, meanwhile horizontal forms became only a fortnightly occurrence.

Development 
In the 2000s, a $6.4 million ministry-funded three-stage upgrade began at the school. The three-level building houses social science classrooms, a new library, and student service and social support centres were completed in the second term of 2009. In late 2015, it was announced that $26 million redevelopment of the school's main block was to commence the following year. The main block, which was initially built in 1927 upon the school's establishment, was described by local MP Maggie Barry as an "appalling sight." The redevelopment of the main block coincided with similar work being done on the school's science block, which was completed mid-2016. The work on the main building, described as one of the most expensive in New Zealand's history, was completed in 2020.

Enrolment 
Like many secondary schools in Auckland, Takapuna Grammar School operates an enrolment scheme to help curb roll numbers and prevent overcrowding. The school's enrolment zone, in which students residing are automatically entitled to be enrolled without rejection, covers the suburbs of Devonport, Narrow Neck, Bayswater, Belmont, Hauraki, Takapuna and parts of Milford. Students residing outside the zone are accepted as roll places allow per the enrolment scheme order of preference and secret ballot, with siblings of current students getting first preference.

At the August 2011 Education Review Office (ERO) review of the school, Takapuna Grammar School had 1420 students, including 195 international students. Fifty-three percent of students were male and 47 percent were female. Sixty-five percent of students at the school identified as New Zealand European (Pākehā), nine percent as British or Irish, five percent as Māori, five percent as Korean, and three percent as Chinese.

Curriculum 
As a state school, Takapuna Grammar School follows The New Zealand Curriculum. Students in Year 11 complete the National Certificate of Educational Achievement (NCEA) level 1. In Years 12 and 13, students can continue with NCEA levels 2 and 3, or complete the International Baccalaureate (IB) Diploma Programme.

Notable students and alumni

 Finn Andrews – songwriter/musician, The Veils
 Sir Peter Blake – yachtsman
 Barry Brickell OBE – potter and conservationist
 Sophia Burn – musician, The Veils
 Howard Charles Clark – academic
 Hon Bruce Cliffe – cabinet minister
 Murray Deaker – deputy principal, radio host and television presenter

 Jacko Gill – shotputter
 Juliette Haigh – 1996–2000 – rower 
 Paul Hitchcock – cricketer
 Gary Hurring – swimmer
 Brad Johnstone – rugby coach
 Marty Johnstone – (Mr Asia) murdered drug dealer
 Richard Jones – cricketer
 Eliza McCartney (2010–14) – pole vaulter
 Danny Morrison – cricketer
 Paul Moss – general manager of Media Prima network, judge in 8TV's One in a Million singing contest and Malaysian Idol
 Simon Poelman – decathlete
 Ralph Roberts – yachtsman
 Pamela Stephenson – Pamela Helen Stephenson Connolly – clinical psychologist, writer and actress 
 Bert Sutcliffe – cricketer
 Sara Tetro – host of the TV3 NZ reality series New Zealand's Next Top Model
 Stephen Tindall – entrepreneur and founder of The Warehouse
 Pippa Wetzell – television presenter
 Gin Wigmore – singer/songwriter
 Peter Williams 1997–2001 – Alpine Skier 2010 Winter Olympics
 Ella Yelich-O'Connor (professionally known as Lorde), singer-songwriter
 Sean Wainui - Professional Rugby player (NZ Maori, Chiefs, Crusaders, Taranaki, Bay of Plenty)
Groups
 The Checks – musicians

Notable former staff
 Ruth Aitken ONZM – 1980–1990 – English teacher – coach of the Silver Ferns 2001–2012
 Bessie Christie – painter, art teacher between 1935 and 1940
 Shaunagh Craig – Northern Ireland netball international
 Graham (Red) Delamore – Deputy headmaster mid 60s until early 70s, member of 1949 All Black touring team
 Jack Kelly – Headmaster 1970–1985, member of 1953–1954 All Black touring team

References

External links
 School website
 Education Review Office (ERO) reports

Educational institutions established in 1927
North Shore, New Zealand
Secondary schools in Auckland
International Baccalaureate schools in New Zealand
1927 establishments in New Zealand
Heritage New Zealand Category 1 historic places in the Auckland Region